Memories of a River is a 1990 Hungarian drama film directed by Judit Elek. It is a historical film set in 1882 and tells the story of the last trial in Hungary of a Jew for ritual murder.

Synopsis
In the 19th century Austro-Hungarian Empire David Hersko, a Jewish shepherd, witnesses the attack of a young girl. His home is burned down and he finds shelter with the family of a Jewish logger. The loggers find the body of a young woman which they bury, going against local laws. They are charged with her murder and it is believed that they killed her as a ritual murder.

Cast
Sándor Gáspár as Herskó Dávid
András Stohl as Matej
Pál Hetényi as Csepkanics
Zoltán Mucsi as Jákob
Franciszek Pieczka as Vogel Ansel
János Ács as Vay György
Tamás Fodor as Eötvös Károly
Róbert Koltai as Scharf József
Andor Lukáts as Schwarz Salamon
Georgiana Tarjan as Sára

Controversy
For the purposes of the film 14 sheep were spread with flammable substance, and then to the order by Judit Elek were burned alive. 69 scientists from the Jagiellonian University demanded from authorities of forbidding Judit Elek entry to Poland. Scientists wrote among others: "No director knowing her own worth would debase herself for using so primitive and cruel methods".

Awards
The film won the Prize of the Ecumenical Jury at the 1989 Montréal World Film Festival. In 1990 it won the Grand Prix at the Créteil International Women's Film Festival.

References

External links

 

1990 films
French historical drama films
1990s Hungarian-language films
Films directed by Judit Elek
Films set in 1882
Films set in Hungary
Hungarian historical drama films
1990s historical drama films
1990 drama films
1990s French films